The fifth election to Pembrokeshire County Council was held in March 1901.  It was preceded by the 1898 election and followed by the 1904 election.

Overview of the result
Only eleven seats were contested and, as a result, the vast majority of wards resulted in unopposed returns.

Boundary changes
There were no boundary changes at this election.

Results

Ambleston

Amroth

Begelly

Burton

Camrose
Having been defeated in 1898, Canton regained his seat without opposition.

Carew

Castlemartin

Clydey

Eglwyswrw

Fishguard

Haverfordwest, Prendergast and Uzmaston

Haverfordwest St Martin's and St Mary's
W.H. George was elected by the casting vote of the Mayor.

Haverfordwest, St Thomas and Furzy Park

Haverfordwest St Martin's Hamlets

Henry's Mote

Kilgerran

Lampeter Velfrey

Llanfyrnach

Llangwm

Llanstadwell

Llanwnda

Llawhaden

Maenclochog

Manorbier

Mathry

Milford
Dr Griffith had stood as a Liberal in 1892 and a Liberal Unionist in 1895.

Monkton

Narberth North

Nevern

Newport

Pembroke Ward 30

Pembroke Ward 31

Pembroke Dock Ward 32

Pembroke Dock Ward 33

Pembroke Dock Ward 34

Pembroke Dock Ward 35

Pembroke Dock Ward 36

St David's

St Dogmaels

St Ishmaels

St Issels

Slebech and Martletwy

Steynton

Tenby Ward 44

Tenby Ward 45

Stokes had previously represented Manorbier

Walwyn's Castle

Whitchurch

Wiston

Election of aldermen
Aldermen were elected at the first meeting of the new council.

References

1901
19th century in Pembrokeshire
1901 Welsh local elections